Synchromy (French: Synchromie) is a 1971 National Film Board of Canada visual music film by Norman McLaren utilizing graphical sound. To produce the film's musical soundtrack, McLaren photographed rectangular cards with lines on them. He arranged these shapes in sequences on the analog optical sound track to produce notes and chords. He then reproduced the sequence of shapes, colorized, in the image portion of the film, so that audiences see the shapes that they are also hearing, as sound.

McLaren had experimented with this technique for creating notes through patterns of stripes on the soundtrack area of the film in the 1950s, working with Evelyn Lambart. Their technique was based on earlier work in graphical sound by German pioneer Rudolf Pfenninger and Russian Nikolai Voinov.

The creation of Synchromy was documented by Gavin Millar in a 1970 film called The Eye Hears, The Ear Sees. In McLaren's production notes, he stated that "Apart from planning and executing the music, the only creative aspect of the film was the “choreographing” of the striations in the columns and deciding on the sequence and combinations of colours."

The film received eight awards, including a Special Jury Mention at the Annecy International Animated Film Festival.

References

Terence Dobson, The Film Work of Norman McLaren (Eastleigh: John Libbey Publishing, 2006)

External links

1971 films
Films directed by Norman McLaren
Visual music
Animated films without speech
National Film Board of Canada animated short films
Quebec films
Graphical sound
1970s animated short films
1971 animated films
Canadian animated short films
Canadian musical films
1970s Canadian films